Fahad Afdhal Alhashmi (born 31 July 1982) is an Emirati cricketer. A right-handed batsman and right-arm fast-medium bowler, he has played for the United Arab Emirates national cricket team since 2005, and first played One Day International (ODI) cricket in 2008.

Biography

Born in Dubai in 1982, Fahad Alhashmi first played for the UAE in the 2005 ICC Intercontinental Cup semi-final against Ireland. He played once against Namibia in 2006, once against Bermuda in 2007 and four matches in the tournament in 2008.

In March 2008, he played for the UAE in matches against English county sides Essex, Lancashire and Yorkshire. He made his ODI debut against Bangladesh in the 2008 Asia Cup and most recently represented his country in the 2015 Cricket World Cup against South Africa.

References

1982 births
Living people
Sportspeople from Dubai
United Arab Emirates One Day International cricketers
Cricketers at the 2015 Cricket World Cup
Emirati cricketers